Smith's Dock Company, Limited, often referred to simply as Smith's Dock, was a British shipbuilding company.

History
The company was originally established by Thomas Smith who bought William Rowe's shipyard at St. Peter's in Newcastle upon Tyne in 1810 and traded as William Smith & Co. The company opened its dock in North Shields in 1851. One of the first ships to be launched at the yard was Termagent in 1852. The company changed its name to Smith's Dock Co. in 1891.

The company became associated with South Bank, North Riding of Yorkshire, after opening an operation there in 1907. Smith's Dock increasingly concentrated its shipbuilding business on the River Tees in South Bank, with its North Shields Yard being used mainly for repair work (in particular oil tankers) from 1909 onwards. Despite the shift of focus, The company's headquarters remained at North Shields.

The yard also built s for the Royal Navy including HMT Walnut, which later became a famous refugee ship in Canada. Of the 20 of this class built for the Royal Navy, 4 were built by Smith's Dock.

Flower-class corvettes

In January 1939, William Reed of Smith's Docks Co. was approached by the British Admiralty with a request for a design of a cheap and simple multi-role warship capable of being built in the multitude of small civilian shipyards not usually accustomed to building to naval standards. Smith Docks was highly regarded by the Admiralty because it had designed the Z-class whaler during World War I and was famed for its reputation for the construction of whale-catchers. Reed's resultant design suggestion was based on a larger version of the company's new whaler, with a number of modifications. The length, for instance, was increased by 30 feet to give a higher speed, and two marine oil-fired boilers were to be fitted as these could be supplied in about 16 weeks instead of water tube boilers which would not be available for at least seven months.

On 27 February 1939 the British Admiralty approved William Reed's sketch design and, with war becoming ever more likely, a bulk order was placed with the aim of creating a viable anti-submarine force where none had existed before. The first order, for twenty-six vessels, was soon followed by others, and by the end of 1939 no less than 110 vessels of this kind were under construction at various shipyards around the country (including by some large ones, such as the Harland and Wolff yard at Belfast). 
Smith's Dock built 12 of the total of 196 built of this class.

French Flower-class corvettes
At the outbreak of World War II the Marine nationale (French Navy) needed ships for anti-submarine warfare (ASW) and, following the Royal Navy (RN)'s example, placed orders from Smith's Dock for four corvettes. Following this the Marine nationale ordered a further 18 ships, to be built at a number of British and French shipyards. These were identical to the British Flower-class corvettes except that French  and 13.2 mm anti-aircraft guns were to be fitted.

The Fall of France in June 1940 brought a drastic change to these building programmes. Of the original four French Flower-class corvettes, La Bastiaise was mined on builders trials and the others were taken over by the RN on completion.

Of the second group, the 12 ships ordered from British yards were taken over by the RN and re-armed with British ordnance; all were renamed and given Flower names in keeping with the class.

Orders for six of the second group were placed with Smith's Dock.

Before the ship was commissioned there would be a brief "Contractors Trial" which was followed by "Acceptance Trials"; two days later, on completion of trials, the ship would be formally commissioned, then fully stored and take to sea. These ships could be constructed and commissioned in, on average, just six months.

Merger
In 1966 Smith's Dock merged with Swan Hunter & Wigham Richardson to form Associated Shipbuilders, later to become Swan Hunter Group.

In 1968, the company completed the first British-built and owned container ship, Manchester Challenge of 12,039 gross register tons, for operation on Manchester Liners new container service to ports on the St Lawrence Seaway, Canada. By 1971, the company had delivered three further ships of this design  to Manchester Liners.

In 1983 to 1984 Smith's Dock delivered two roll-on-roll-off ships for Brazilian owners.

The South Bank shipyard on the River Tees finally closed in February 1987.

See also
 List of shipbuilders and shipyards

References

Notes

Bibliography

Defunct shipbuilding companies of the United Kingdom
Defunct companies based in Tyne and Wear
Manufacturing companies established in 1810
Manufacturing companies disestablished in 1987
1810 establishments in England
1987 disestablishments in England
British companies established in 1810
North Shields
1966 mergers and acquisitions
British companies disestablished in 1987
British Shipbuilders